Haçaqaya (also, Achakaya) is a village in the Goygol Rayon of Azerbaijan.  The village forms part of the municipality of Qırıqlı.

Notable natives 

 Elshad Mammadov — National Hero of Azerbaijan.

References 

Populated places in Goygol District